Thryptomene calcicola is a species of flowering plant in the family Myrtaceae and is endemic to a small area in the north-west of Western Australia. It is an erect, sometimes spreading shrub with upwards-pointing linear leaves, and pinkish-mauve flowers with five petals and ten stamens.

Description
Flowering occurs from June to late October.

Taxonomy
Thryptomene calcicola was first formally described in 2014 by Barbara Lynette Rye in the journal Nuytsia from specimens collected by Malcolm Eric Trudgen in Kalbarri National Park in 2002. The specific epithet (calcicola) means "lime-inhabitant", referring to the limestone habitat of this species.

Distribution and habitat
This thryptomene only occurs in a small area of Kalbarri National Park where it grows in Acacia shrubland.

Conservation status
Thryptomene calcicola is classified as "Priority Two" by the Western Australian Government Department of Parks and Wildlife, meaning that it is poorly known and from only one or a few locations.

References

calcicola
Endemic flora of Western Australia
Endangered flora of Australia
Rosids of Western Australia
Plants described in 2014